The All-NBL Team is an annual National Basketball League (NBL) honour bestowed on the best players in the league following every NBL season. The team has been selected in every season since the league's second year in 1980.

In 2016 and 2017, the All-NBL Team was chosen via a voting system involving the head coach, one assistant coach and the team captain of each team. Voters selected their All-NBL First and Second Teams by selecting three 'outside' players and two 'inside' players for each team. Players were then allocated 3 points for being placed into a First Team and 2 points for being placed into a Second Team. These points were then combined, with the Top 10 players making up the First and Second Teams, allowing for an even spread of three 'outside' players and two 'inside' players on each team.

Between 1980 and 1983, the Most Valuable Player (MVP) did not feature in the All-NBL Team.

Selections

1980 to 1986 
From the 1980 season to 1986 season, the All-NBL Team was composed of one team.

1987 to 1991 
From the 1987 season to 1991 season, the All-NBL Team was composed of two teams.

1992 to 2012–13 
From the 1992 season to 2012–13 season, the All-NBL Team was composed of three teams (except in 1997 when only two teams were named).

2013–14 to present 
Since the 2013–14 season, the All-NBL Team has been composed of two teams.

References

External links 
 All-NBL Teams 1980–2001
 All-NBL Team 2002
 All-NBL Team 2003
 All-NBL Team 2004
 All-NBL Team 2005
 All-NBL Team 2006
 All-NBL Team 2007
 All-NBL Team 2008
 All-NBL Team 2009
 All-NBL Team 2010
 All-NBL Team 2011
 All-NBL Team 2012
 All-NBL Team 2013
 All-NBL Team 2014
 All-NBL Team 2015
 All-NBL Team 2016
 All-NBL Team 2017
 All-NBL Team 2018
 All-NBL Team 2019
 All-NBL Team 2020
 All-NBL Team 2021
 All-NBL Team 2022
 All-NBL Team 2023

All-NBL Team